Nels Jensen (born March 24, 1981) is an American record producer, recording engineer, and mixing engineer.  He has worked professionally in the music business as of 2004 when he moved to Los Angeles.  He works out of his analog recording studio The Pie Studios in Pasadena, CA.  He first got his start working at Jamie Foxx's Foxxhole studios where he worked with Foxx and countless other stars doing collaborations with Foxx.  Jensen now does production and writing for some of the industries most talented people and rising stars.

Early life and education

Early life 
Nels was born in San Dimas, California the first born to his Mother who worked in advertisement and his Father Nels Sr. who was in construction.  His family moved around a lot in his early years and he eventually ended up in San Bernardino.  His love of music was prevalent from an early age where he would play his fathers Beach Boy's tapes (which whom will later work with) until they would play no more.  At the age of 12 he started playing guitar and bass and started playing in bands.  He mostly played in punk bands and had some success in this field, in his late teens he started to tour and grew to quickly dislike it.  He wanted to do music so he traded sides of glass going from musician to producer.

Education 
Nels went to college at Fullerton and studied religious studies.  During his studies his mother convinced him to change majors, worried that he would hate academia.  Nels was eventually convinced and first went to the Musicians Institute in Hollywood California.  He received a Journeyman degree in audio engineering and a second Journeyman degree in music business.  Nels wanting more education went on to get his bachelor's degree in music production from Full Sail University in Winter Park Florida.

External links
 The Pie Studios
 Discogs
 Allmusic
 IMDB
 

Living people
Record producers from California
1981 births